Alyze Elyse is an American Screenwriter , songwriter, filmmaker and actress.

Career
Alyze Elyse is the co-owner of Soul City Films and owner and Executive Producer of Alyze Elyse Productions, an independent production company. She is also the first African American independent female filmmaker known to garner over 100 million min streamed on Amazon Prime.

Filmography 
Alyze Elyse wrote, produced, and starred:

 Innocent (2008)
 I'm That Kind of Woman (2012)
 Behind Closed Doors (2013)
 24 Hours (2014)
 House Arrest (2016)
 Flowers (2016)
 Zoo Escape ( 2018 )
 David ( 2018 )
 Going 4 Broke (2020)
 BLAME 
 BLAME THE BEGINNING

Music 

 What I Did for Love (2003) 
 Soul City Presents Alyze Elyse (2005)
 Innocent (2007)

She got singles ranked on Billboard and other charts.

In 2017 she released her Billboard charting Single U GOT ME TRAPPED.

Discography

Charted singles

References

21st-century African-American women singers
American women film producers
Living people
American hip hop singers
Musicians from Greensboro, North Carolina
Singers from North Carolina
Songwriters from North Carolina
African-American actresses
Year of birth missing (living people)
Actresses from North Carolina
African-American songwriters